The space program of Turkey is the space policy implemented by Turkey to further its interests in aerospace. Turkey first began developing its space program in 1993, and it has been under the authority of the Turkish Space Agency since 2018. Turkey has launched several satellites, and its current objective is to achieve a moon landing in 2023.

History 
The space program of Turkey developed as part of the Turkish Science and Technology Policy under the authority of the Scientific and Technological Research Council of Turkey in 1993, which designated space technology as one of the primary fields of technology. The Turkish Air Force was tasked with making recommendations on a national space agency in 2001. The stated objectives of the Turkish Space Agency include development and resource independence through space technology. The Turkish Space Agency also seeks to develop the space program to increase Turkey's influence and recognition on the world stage. President Recep Tayyip Erdoğan ordered the creation of the Turkish Space Agency in 2018.

In 2021, President Erdoğan announced a 10-year plan for Turkey's space program. The primary objective of this plan is to achieve a moon landing through international cooperation in 2023 to mark Turkey's centennial, followed by an independent moon landing in 2028. Other objectives include development of new space technologies, establishment of a spaceport, the formation of a Space Technology Department, and sending a Turkish citizen to space on a scientific mission.

Satellites 
The state owned satellite communications company Türksat began launching a series of Türksat satellites in 1994. The TÜBİTAK Space Technologies Research Institute is responsible for research and development relating to space technology. It has developed multiple Earth observation satellites, including BILSAT-1 in 2003 and RASAT in 2011. Turkey has also developed the Göktürk series of satellites for military use. Other satellite-related projects being developed by the space program of Turkey include the Regional Positioning and Timing System and the Space Launch System.

See also 

 Science and technology in Turkey

References 

Science and technology in Turkey
Space program of Turkey
Space programs by country